Johan Hjalmar (Jalmari) Viljanen (15 August 1872 – 12 September 1928) was a Finnish farmer and politician, born in Nastola. At first active in the Finnish Party, he was a member of the Parliament of Finland from 1922 to 1924, representing the National Coalition Party.

References

1872 births
1928 deaths
People from Nastola
People from Häme Province (Grand Duchy of Finland)
Finnish Party politicians
National Coalition Party politicians
Members of the Parliament of Finland (1922–24)